Ted Poley (born January 5, 1964) is an American singer who is best known as the lead vocalist of the hard rock band Danger Danger.

Biography 
Poley joined New Jersey progressive rock band Prophet as a drummer. They released their first album in 1985. Poley also sang lead vocals on some of their songs. In 1987, while working with the band's second album, he was approached by Bruno Ravel and Steve West to join Danger Danger and he accepted.

With Danger Danger, Poley enjoyed much success as the band caught the late surge wave of 1980s glam metal. Together they released two albums (Danger Danger and Screw It!) and toured with bands like KISS, Alice Cooper, and others.

In 1993, he finished recording Danger Danger's third album, Cockroach, but was surprisingly fired from the band. They hired another singer (Paul Laine) and attempted to release the album with new vocals, but Poley sued and prevented the album from being released.

The same year, he formed a new band called Bone Machine with guitarist John Allen III (Tommy Lee's band). In 1994, they released their first album titled Dogs. In 1995, they toured the UK and released a live record titled Search and Destroy. In 1996, they released their last album titled Disappearing, Inc. The album is noted for featuring an eerie premonition of what would happen in the 2001 9/11 attacks in the cover art.

In 2000, he joined the band Melodica with Gerhard Pichler on guitar. As a band, they released several albums: USAcoustica, and Lovemetal among them. During this time, Poley returned to the U.S. and played for the first time in seven years.

In 2001, Danger Danger finally released the album Cockroach after reaching an agreement with Epic Records. The album featured two discs: one with the Poley vocals, and the other with the new vocals by the band's new singer, Paul Laine.

In 2002, Poley's band (now known as Poley/Pichler) released an album titled Big. This album featured Gerhard Pichler on guitar, Joe Slattery on bass (with whom Poley had played before in Lush back in the early 1980s) and Slattery's bandmate from the AOR melodic rock band Norway, Marty Brasington on drums.

In 2004, he rejoined Danger Danger and started touring with them again.

In 2016, he formed Tokyo Motor Fist with Trixter guitarist Steve Brown. Their first album was released on February 24, 2017.

In popular culture 
 Poley has recorded some songs for video games in the Sonic the Hedgehog series. His contributions to the series include "Lazy Days...Livin' In Paradise", the theme of Big in Sonic Adventure; "Escape from the City", the theme of the "City Escape" stage from Sonic Adventure 2; "We Can", Team Sonic's Theme in Sonic Heroes (with Tony Harnell); and "Race to Win", the theme of Sonic Rivals 2. Poley also worked on two remixes of "Escape from the City" for Sonic Generations; one in collaboration with Cash Cash and one solo remix with Jun Senoue on guitar.
 In 2008, rock & roll comic C.C. Banana recorded a song called "Ted Poley", released on the album "KISS MY ANKH: A Tribute To Vinnie Vincent." The song is actually a parody of the Kiss song "Unholy", inspired by the story of Poley's first encounter with Kiss lead singer Paul Stanley.

Releases

Mr. Speed 
 Hollywood Wild (1982)

Prophet 
 Prophet (1985)

Danger Danger 
 Danger Danger (1989)
 Down And Dirty Live (1990)
 Screw It! (1991)
 Cockroach (2001)
 Revolve (2009)

Bone Machine 
 Dogs (1994)
 Search and Destroy (Live, 1995)
 Live in the UK (VHS & VCD, 1996)
 Disappearing, Inc. (1996)

Melodica 
 Long Way From Home (2000)
 USAcoustica (2001)
 Lovemetal (2001)
 Livemetal (Live, 2002)
 Live in Springfield

Poley/Pichler 
 Big (2002)

Ted Poley 
 Collateral Damage (2006)
 Smile (2007)
 Greatestits Vol.1 (2009)
 Greatest Hits – Volume 2 (2014)
 Beyond the Fade (2016)
 Modern Art (with Degreed) (2018)

Pleasure Dome 
 For Your Personal Amusement (2008)

Poley/Rivera 
 Only Human (2008)

Tokyo Motor Fist 
 Tokyo Motor Fist (2017)
 Lions (2020)

See also 
 Danger Danger
 Prophet

References

External links 
 Danger Danger official site

American heavy metal singers
American male singers
Danger Danger members
Living people
People from Englewood, New Jersey
1964 births